Iuliia  Morozova (Russian: Юлия Константиновна Морозова; born 8 January 1985, in Chelyabinsk) is a Russian volleyball player.

Career
Morozova won the Best Spiker individual award in the 2011 FIVB World Grand Prix were her home national team ended up in fourth place.

Clubs
  Avtodor-Metar (2003–2011)
  Dynamo Moscow (2011–present)

Awards

Individual
 2011 World Grand Prix "Best Blocker"
 2013 World Grand Champions Cup - "Best Middle Blocker"

References

External links
 FIVB profile

Russian women's volleyball players
1985 births
Living people
Sportspeople from Chelyabinsk
20th-century Russian women
21st-century Russian women